Toronto was represented at the Macdonald Brier (now called the Tim Hortons Brier), Canada's national men's curling championship with a separate entry from 1927 to 1931.

From 1927 to 1929, Toronto was represented by winners of the Canada Life Trophy, while in 1930 and 1931, it was represented by winners of the Grand Aggregate of the Toronto Bonspiel. In 1932, winners of these events entered a playoff with the winners of the Ontario Tankard (today known as the Silver Tankard) to determine southern Ontario's representative at the Brier, while in 1933 the winner of the Toronto Bonspiel played the winner of the Ontario Tankard to represent Ontario. The Ontario Tankard would be the sole provincial championship until a separate event sponsored by British Consols Cigarettes was created in 1938. Prior to 1932, Toronto and southern Ontario had separate representatives at the Brier, with (southern) Ontario being represented by the winner of the Ontario Tankard.

Teams did not have to represent clubs in the city to represent it at the Brier. Indeed, two of the five rinks to represent Toronto came from clubs outside the city. Paradoxically, the 1931 Brier's Ontario representative was from a Toronto club, while Toronto's representative was from Barrie.

Representatives

References

Curling in Toronto
The Brier
Ontario Tankard
1920s in Toronto
1930s in Toronto